The Joe and Barbara Schwartz Center is a multi-purpose arena on the campus of Cape Fear Community College in Wilmington, North Carolina.  With a capacity of 1,800 people, it is home to the Cape Fear Sea Devils junior college basketball and volleyball teams. The arena was completed in October 2000.

References

Indoor arenas in North Carolina
American Basketball Association (2000–present) venues
Basketball venues in North Carolina
Sports venues in Wilmington, North Carolina
College volleyball venues in the United States
College basketball venues in the United States
2000 establishments in North Carolina
Sports venues completed in 2000